Chatswood is a major business and residential district in the Lower North Shore of Sydney, in the state of New South Wales, Australia, 10 kilometres north of the Sydney central business district. It is the administrative centre of the local government area of the City of Willoughby.  It is often colloquially referred to as "Chatty".

History 

Chatswood was named after Charlotte Harnett, wife of then Mayor of Willoughby and a pioneer of the district, Richard Harnett, and the original "wooded" nature of the area. The moniker derives from her nickname "Chattie" and was shortened from Chattie's Wood to Chatswood in the mid-1800's.

Residential settlement of Chatswood began in 1876 and grew with the installation of the North Shore railway line in 1890 and also increased with the opening of the Harbour Bridge in 1932.

Chatswood Post Office opened on 1 August 1879, closed in 1886 and reopened in 1887.

By 1900, Chatswood was easily accessible by public transport. In 1898, the electric tram line, running along Willoughby Road and Penshurst Street, had reached Victoria Avenue, and in 1908, it was extended to Chatswood railway station. In 1903 the council chambers moved from Mowbray Road to Victoria Ave.

At this time Chatswood's history contained orchards and dairy farms on the west side of the train station as well as factories, such as Dairy Farmers Inc and Three Threes Pickle Factory on what was then Gordon Road (now the Pacific Hwy). Although now predominantly a commercial and residential area, Chatswood has an industrial past. Other factories included; Ferguson Transformers, after which Ferguson Lane is named, and the Caroma factory (formerly Marshman Brothers), now converted to residential units and a small garden park. In the eastern part of the suburb, along Scott's Creek, there were several tanneries; the last of these closed in 1992. There is still an area with some light industry in the eastern part of the suburb.

Chatswood was declared a town centre in 1983 and a city in 1989.

Heritage listings 
Chatswood has a number of heritage-listed sites, including:
 Windsor Gardens
 Hilton
 Seven Gables
 Wyckliffe (listed by Willoughby Council)

Economy
Chatswood is one of the North Shore's major commercial and retail districts. The "Sydney global economic corridor", is used to describe a geographical "arch" of Sydney, home to international corporations. Many retail outlets are situated along Victoria Avenue and many office buildings are situated along Pacific Highway.

Corporate headquarters
The Australian headquarters of Smith's Snackfood, Abigroup, Carnival Australia, Coffey, PepsiCo and Carter Holt Harvey as well as offices of Nortel Networks, Optus, Lenovo, NEC, Leighton Contractors and Huawei are located in Chatswood.  A number of high-density residential towers are also located in Chatswood.

Retail and shopping
Chatswood has two major shopping centres: Chatswood Chase Sydney and Westfield Chatswood. There are also a few smaller shopping centres such as Mandarin Centre, Chatswood Interchange, Chatswood Place, Lemon Grove, The Gallery, Victoria Plaza and Orchard Arcade.

Outdoor markets
The Chatswood Mall Markets are held each Thursday and Friday in Chatswood Mall, Victoria Avenue and feature food and craft stalls, and live music.

Restaurants and cafes
Chatswood has a wide variety of restaurants and cafes and is known as a major dining destination in the Lower North Shore of Sydney. There are a large number of Chinese (including Cantonese), Japanese and Korean restaurants and eateries.

Hotels
There are many hotels in Chatswood. This includes The Mantra, near Chatswood railway station, The Sebel, near Westfield Shopping Centre, and as the Meriton Serviced Apartments Chatswood, built in 2015. The Chatswood Club, located on Help Street adjacent to Pacific Highway, is a venue hall which caters to weddings, birthdays, cocktail parties, and other age-appropriate festivities.

Transport

Sydney Trains

Chatswood railway station is served by the T1 North Shore & Western Line and the T9 Northern Line as part of the Sydney Trains network. Southbound rail services run to the Sydney CBD before continuing to the western suburbs. Northbound rail services run to Hornsby and some peak hour services run to Gosford and Wyong. Before the conversion of the Epping to Chatswood railway line (opened in 2009) to part of the metro network, Chatswood Station served as a junction between that line and the North Shore Line.

Sydney Metro

The first stage of the Sydney Metro runs from Tallawong railway station in North West Sydney to Chatswood Station. An extension of the line to the Sydney CBD is currently (2019) under construction.

Sydney Buses

Chatswood is a major bus terminus with services to the city, North Sydney, Mosman, St Leonards/Crows Nest, Manly, Warringah Mall/Brookvale, Ku-ring-gai, Lindfield Precinct, Belrose, Narrabeen, Frenchs Forest, Mona Vale, Burwood, Top Ryde, Macquarie Park/Centre, Castle Hill, Norwest Park, Cammeray, Crows Nest, Killarney Heights and Willoughby.

An interstate bus service between Sydney and Brisbane via the North Coast stops at Chatswood.

Roads

Major roads through Chatswood include the Pacific Highway, Mowbray Road, Boundary Street, Willoughby Road, Eastern Valley Way and Victoria Avenue. The latter forms a pedestrian mall for the section running through the main retail area.

Demographics

In the 2016 Australian census, the total population of Chatswood was 24,913; 11,786 (47.3%) were male and 13,127 (52.7%) were female.  32.4% of all residents were born in Australia. The most common non-Australian countries and regions of birth were China (20.7%), South Korea (6.5%), Hong Kong (5.3%), India (3.5%) and Taiwan (2.8%). 33.6% of people only spoke English at home. Other languages spoken at home included Mandarin (22.9%), Cantonese (12.3%), Korean (7.2%), Japanese (2.9%) and Hindi (1.4%).

The most common responses for religion were No Religion (42.6%) and Catholic (15.8%).

Culture

The Willoughby Spring Festival is held in Chatswood in September annually. It is the second-largest in Lower Northern Sydney and is intended as testimony to a modern, multicultural and prosperous Chatswood. It showcases music, theatre, live performances, outdoor events, kids' events and visual arts. Willoughby Theatre Company (formerly Willoughby Musical Society) is based in Chatswood. It specialises in musical theatre. Chatswood Musical Society also performs musical theatre, but their events are staged in Pymble. The Zenith Theatre stages both musicals and drama. The Willoughby Symphony Orchestra is based in Chatswood.  Two dance companies share the Dance and Music Centre. A Chinese Cultural Centre has existed since 1996. The Willoughby Historical Society runs the Willoughby Museum in Boronia, a Federation cottage in South Chatswood. The Concourse, Chatswood, a new cultural centre, was commissioned by Willoughby Council in 2007 and was completed in 2011. It includes the 5,000 m2 Chatswood Library, a 1,000-seat concert hall, 500-seat theatre, exhibition spaces, commercial spaces, cafes and restaurants. The Concourse was opened on 11 September 2011 by the Governor of NSW, Her Excellency Professor Marie Bashir AC CVO.

Schools 

Chatswood has both public and private primary and secondary schools. These include:
 Chatswood High School (Years 7–12). Originally a boys' school with a Cadet Corps until the 1950s when it changed to a coeducational school.
 Chatswood Public School (Years K–6). Opened in 1883.
 St Pius X College (Years 5–12) (originally called Christian Brothers)
Our Lady of Dolours Catholic Primary School (years K–6)
Mercy Catholic College (years 7–12) (originally called St Catherine's)

The Mowbray House School operated in Chatswood from 1906 until its closure in 1954. The Church of England Girls' School Chatswood was also formerly located in Chatswood, having been closed since the 1940s.

Places of Worship
 Grace City Church Chatswood (Doherty Community Centre)
 LifeSource Christian Church
 Our Lady of Dolours Catholic Church
 St Paul's Anglican Church
 Chatswood Baptist Church
 Chatswood Presbyterian Church
 Chatswood Church of Christ
 Chatswood Seventh-Day Adventist Church
 Chatswood Christian Science Church
 Armenian Apostolic Church of Holy Resurrection
 Salvation Army, Chatswood Corps
 Chatswood Malayalam (Pentecostal) Church
 IBAA Chatswood Buddhist Centre
 Tibetan Buddhist Healing Practices
 Hillsong Chatswood (Chinese Extension Service)
 Church of Scientology Advanced Organization and Saint Hill ANZO
 North Shore Temple Emanuel (Jewish)

Sports clubs
 Chatswood Rangers Sports Club – football and netball
 Chatswood Gypsies Cricket Club – cricket
 Chatswood Rugby Club – rugby union
 Chatswood Lawn Bowls and Croquet club
 Chatswood Tennis Club
 Chatswood Golf Course
 Chatswood Scout Group
 Chatswood Girl Guides Group

Climate

Parks

Chatswood Oval is located south of the railway station. Beauchamp Park, located on Nicholson Street, features a playground, an oval, a fenced dog area and a bike track. It was named after William Lygon, 7th Earl Beauchamp, the Governor of New South Wales. In 2015 a memorial to the Armenian community was erected in the park. Another small but well-laid out park, with an industrial heritage theme, is the Mashman Park on Victoria Avenue at Septimus Street. This park pays tribute to the Mashmans brick and tile works that once stood there. Chatswood is close to Lane Cove National Park.

July 2016 saw the unveiling of Bartels Park in Chatswood West. Named in honour of the recently deceased former Willoughby Mayor Greg Bartels, the park is the former Edgar Street reserve.

The Garden of Remembrance, near the railway station, commemorates the fallen men of the suburb who fought in the Boer War, World War 1, World War 2, The Korean War and Vietnam War. The roses were all grown from original cuttings of briar roses taken from the Somme region of France where more than one million soldiers were wounded or lost their lives at The Battle of Somme in 1916.
At the centre of the Garden stands the Willoughby Council Peace Tablet, which commemorates the signing of The Treaty of Versailles in 1918.

Notable residents 
Many notable Australians who have contributed to Australian culture and society have lived or were educated in Chatswood. These include:

 actor Ruth Cracknell
 opera singer Yvonne Kenny
 artist Arthur Murch
 poet Banjo Patterson
 poet Kenneth Slessor
 cricketer Mark Taylor
 cricketer Victor Trumper
 painter/artist Brett Whiteley
 pianist Roger Woodward 
 former Prime Minister Gough Whitlam

References

External links 

Willoughby City Council
Chatswood – community profile
Chatswood West/Lane Cove North – community profile
Chatswood Directory – Business and services directory
The Concourse Cultural Centre

 
Suburbs of Sydney
Central business districts in Australia
City of Willoughby